Rudy Patry (born 6 August 1961) is a former Belgian racing cyclist. He rode in Giro d'Italia and the Tour de France.

References

External links

1961 births
Living people
Belgian male cyclists
People from Vilvoorde
Cyclists from Flemish Brabant